The 2014–15 OFC Champions League (officially the 2015 Fiji Airways OFC Champions League for sponsorship reasons) was the 14th edition of the Oceanian Club Championship, Oceania's premier club football tournament organized by the Oceania Football Confederation (OFC), and the 9th season under the current OFC Champions League name.

In an all-New Zealand final, four-time defending champions Auckland City defeated Team Wellington 4–3 on penalties (1–1 after extra time) to win their fifth consecutive and seventh overall title. As the winner of the 2014–15 OFC Champions League, Auckland City earned the right to represent the OFC at the 2015 FIFA Club World Cup.

Teams

A total of 15 teams from all 11 OFC associations entered the competition. The four associations with the best results in the 2013–14 OFC Champions League (Fiji, New Zealand, Tahiti, Vanuatu) were awarded two berths each, and three other associations (New Caledonia, Papua New Guinea, Solomon Islands) were awarded one berth each. Those teams directly entered the group stage, to be joined by the winner of the preliminary stage, which was contested by teams from the four developing associations (American Samoa, Cook Islands, Samoa, Tonga).

Schedule
The schedule of the competition was as follows. For this edition, the semi-finals and final were played as single matches (instead of over two legs on a home-and-away format as in the previous edition).

Preliminary stage
The preliminary stage was played in Apia, Samoa from 7 to 11 October 2014. The draw to determine the fixtures was held on 22 September 2014 at the OFC headquarters in Auckland, New Zealand. The four teams played each other on a round-robin basis. The group winner advanced to the group stage to join the 11 automatic qualifiers.

All times UTC+14.

Group stage
The group stage was played in Ba and Suva, Fiji from 11 to 18 April 2015. The draw for the group stage was held on 5 December 2014 at the OFC headquarters in Auckland, New Zealand. The 12 teams were drawn into three groups of four, with each group containing one team from each of the four pots. The allocation of teams into pots was based on the results of their associations in the previous edition of the OFC Champions League. Teams from the same association could not be drawn into the same group.

The schedule was confirmed on 4 February 2015. In each group, the four teams played each other on a round-robin basis. The group winners and the best runner-up advanced to the semi-finals.

All times UTC+12.

Group A

The kick-off of Group A matches on matchday 2 were delayed by 30 minutes due to heavy rain.

Group B

Group C

Ranking of second-placed teams

Knockout stage
The knockout stage was played in Suva, Fiji from 21 to 26 April 2015. The four teams played on a single-elimination basis.

Bracket

All times UTC+12.

Semi-finals

Final

Awards

Top goalscorers

See also
2015 FIFA Club World Cup

References

External links
OFC Champions League Preliminary 2015, oceaniafootball.com
OFC Champions League 2015, oceaniafootball.com

2014–15
1
2014–15 Ofc Champions League